Liesjärvi National Park is a national park in the Tavastia Proper region of Finland.

In 1920, part of the present-day national park area was already defined as protected area.

As a whole, the national park is a slice of the near-natural state lake highlands of Häme. It includes the Korteniemi traditional estate, where visitors can try their skills in traditional agricultural work.

There are camping places for travel trailers and tents.

See also 
 List of national parks of Finland
 Protected areas of Finland

References

External links
 Outdoors.fi – Liesjärvi National Park

Protected areas established in 1956
Geography of Kanta-Häme
Tammela, Finland
Tourist attractions in Kanta-Häme
National parks of Finland